Provençana is a Barcelona Metro station opened on 2 March 2019, operated by TMB. The metro station is located in L'Hospitalet de Llobregat. The station serves line L10 Sud  and is located between Can Tries | Gornal  and  Foneria stations in the southern part of the metropolitan area. The station is located underneath Carrer de l'Aprestadora.

References

External links

Barcelona Metro line 10 stations
Railway stations in Spain opened in 2019